Let There Be Light (stylised as let there be light.) is the 25th live album of Hillsong Worship, which consists of several worship pastors from Australian church Hillsong Church. The album was recorded during the 2016 Hillsong Conference at the Qudos Bank Arena from 4 July until 7 July 2016 and was released on 14 October 2016, under Hillsong Music, Sparrow Records and Capitol Christian Music Group.

Their music captures the heart and sound of Hillsong Church globally and represents the coming together of the Hillsong worship team from around the world; including Reuben Morgan, Marty Sampson, Joel Houston, Brooke Ligertwood, Ben Fielding, Taya Smith, Dave Ware, Annie Garratt and many more.

Background 
In March 2016, "Grace to Grace" was released and served as a single for Easter.

In July worship leader Ben Fielding said, "We've been intentional about writing songs that will translate across the Church globally." From many of the Hillsong global campuses such as Sydney, London, New York and Los Angeles, songs were written, re-written and collaborated on in the lead up to the album recording.

"The collaborations have been more through relationship this year, and it has felt less segmented. We've been writing in the studio and there would be people from three different campuses in three different countries there. Each would be representing their own congregation's unique sound, but working together to create something that will translate for all campuses."

The title of the album is a reference to Genesis 1:3.

Theme 
Rich Langton, who oversees the pastoral care of the creative team in Australia, said, "Jesus is the light of the world and we carry that too."

Awards and accolades 
On 9 August 2017, it was announced that Let There Be Light would be nominated for a GMA Dove Award in the Worship Album of the Year and the Long Form Video of the Year categories at the 48th Annual GMA Dove Awards. In addition to the album's nomination, the song "What a Beautiful Name" was nominated for a GMA Dove Award in the Song of the Year and Worship Song of the Year categories. On 17 October 2017, "What a Beautiful Name" won both GMA Dove Awards for Song of the Year and the Worship Song of the Year at a ceremony held at the Allen Arena in Nashville, Tennessee, with composers Brooke Ligertwood and Ben Fielding receiving the awards.

Track listing 

Notes
 "Behold (Then Sings My Soul)" is inspired by “How Great Thou Art”, courtesy of The Stuart Hine Trust.
 "I Will Boast in Christ" contains additional lyrics from "Nothing but the Blood", traditional.

Charts

Weekly charts

Year-end charts

Personnel
Credits adapted from Zendesk and AllMusic.

Vocals

 Annie Garratt — lead vocals
 Ben Fielding — lead vocals
 Benjamin Hastings — lead vocals
 Brooke Ligertwood — lead vocals
 David Ware — lead vocals
 Jad Gillies — lead vocals
 Joel Houston — lead vocals
 Jonathon “JD” Douglass — lead vocals
 Matt Crocker — lead vocals
 Marty Sampson — lead vocals
 Reuben Morgan — lead vocals
 Taya Smith — lead vocals
 Alexander Epa Iosefa — additional vocals
 Alexander Pappas — additional vocals
 Aodhan King — additional vocals
 Chelsea LaRosa — additional vocals
 Dee Uluirewa — additional vocals, vocals coach
 Eric Liljero — additional vocals
 Gloria Mati-Leifi — additional vocals
 Hannah Hobbs — additional vocals
 Jay Cook — additional vocals
 Katie Dodson — additional vocals
 Kris Hodge — additional vocals
 Laura Toggs — additional vocals
 Melodie Wagner — additional vocals
 Rachel Helms — additional vocals
 Renee Sieff — additional vocals
 Tarryn Stokes — additional vocals
 Tyler Douglass — additional vocals

Composer

 Aodhan King — composer
 Ben Fielding — composer
 Benjamin Hastings — composer
 Brooke Ligertwood — composer
 Chris Davenport — composer
 Jamie Snell — composer
 Joel Houston — composer
 Jonas Myrin — composer
 Joshua Grimmett — composer
 Matt Crocker — composer
 Marty Sampson — composer
 Michael Fatkin — composer
 Michael Guy Chislett — composer
 Reuben Morgan — composer
 Scott Groom — composer
 Scott Ligertwood — composer

Technical, strings and horns

 Ben Whincop — record engineer, post production engineer
 Brandon Gillies — assistant record engineer, post production engineer
 Michael Cuthbertson — assistant record engineer
 Michael Guy Chislett — post production engineer, electric guitar
 James Rudder — post production engineer
 Ian Sullivan — post production engineer
 Michael Zuvela — post production engineer
 Grant Konemann — post production engineer, choir recording
 Philip Metcalf — choir recording
 Stephen Marcussen — mastering
 Sam Gibson — mixing
 Stewart Whitmore — digital editing (for Marcussen Mastering, Hollywood, US)
 Autumn Hardman Starra — music director, keys
 Nigel Hendroff — music director, electric guitar, acoustic guitar
 Daniel McMurray — drums
 Harrison Wood — drums
 Matthew Hann — bass guitar
 Jihea Oh — bass guitar
 Matt Tennikoff — bass guitar
 Dylan Thomas — electric guitar
 Jad Gillies — electric guitar
 Jarryd Scully — electric guitar
 Joel Hingston — electric guitar
 Peter James — keys
 David Andrew — keys
 Benjamin Tennikoff — keys
 Jack McGrath — keys
 Tim Kozio — keys
 Nathan Hughes — keys
 Joel Houston — acoustic guitar
 Reuben Morgan — acoustic guitar
 Ben Fielding — acoustic guitar
 Brooke Ligertwood — acoustic guitar
 Michaeli Witney — strings
 Evie Gallardo — strings
 Salla Sinerva — strings
 Corrie Haskins — strings
 Gerard Alvares — strings
 Celeste Shackelton — strings

Event production

 Steve Pippett — production director
 Luke Fairbairn — event production manager
 Kevin Watts — assistant event production manager
 Julian Cepeda — assistant event production manager
 Ian Anderson — technical production manager
 Kayleigh Alexandre — technical director
 Eric Lechner — technical director
 Anthony Gomez — technical director
 Joanna Wakeley — assistant technical director
 Andrew Friesen — assistant technical director
 Wesley Hahn — assistant technical director
 Kelly MacLaggan — assistant technical director
 Michaela Sjøberg — assistant technical director
 Andrew Crawford — head of audio
 Omar Sierra — front of house engineer
 James Rudder — front of house engineer
 Justin “Juzzy” Arthur — front of house engineer
 Erik Viking Carlsson — front of house engineer
 Ryan Johnson — front of house engineer
 Glenn Setchfield — assistant front of house engineer
 Eddie Phiri — assistant front of house engineer
 Kyleigh Allender — front of house communication
 Kevin Kwan — front of house communication
 Reid Wall — monitor engineer
 Brad Law — monitor engineer
 Andrew Howell — monitor engineer
 Ariel Vargas — monitor engineer
 Nicholas Canavan — monitor engineer
 Caleb Taylor — assistant monitor engineer
 Jesse Small — assistant monitor engineer
 Philipp Grimm — assistant monitor engineer
 Blake Pulman — assistant monitor engineer
 Stephanie Gardner — monitor communication
 Sean Wilson — monitor communication
 Mari Bøhlerengen — monitor communication
 Jim Monk — broadcast engineer
 Nathan Steele — broadcast engineer
 Josh Mathis — assistant broadcast engineer
 Fabio George — assistant broadcast engineer
 Beverly Bangard — broadcast communication
 Ben Carbone — broadcast communication
 Ian Hendrick — lighting designer
 Jarrad Donovan — lighting director
 Kevin Stahl — lighting director
 Paul Cox — head backline technician
 Dan Yao — head backline technician
 Laura Kelly — head stage manager
 Kris Mateika — creative design
 Peter “Nubsy” Fairall — creative design
 Nathan Taylor — stage design
 Ricki Cook — engineer
 Gary Beavan — RF technician

Album administration

 Alison Brown — administrator
 Anthony Gomez — administrator
 Chris Neal — administrator
 Jill Casey — administrator
 Josh Olson — administrator
 Laura Kelly — administrator
 Steve Harmeling — administrator

Album artwork

 Jay Argaet — art director, album artwork
 Scott Ligertwood — art director
 Nathan Cahyadi — cover photographer, album artwork
 Nicholas Dellis — album artwork

Project handling and management

 Ben Fielding — product director
 Brooke Ligertwood — product director
 Cassandra Langton — product director
 Joel Houston — product director
 Michael Guy Chislett — product director
 Reuben Morgan — product director
 Matthew Capper — project manager
 Scott Ligertwood — assistant project manager
 Jay Argaet — assistant project manager
 Jose Huergo — assistant project manager, Hillsong Worship band manager
 Grant Thomson — assistant project manager
 Steve McPherson — assistant project manager
 Tim Whincop — assistant project manager

Album Production

 Michael Guy Chislett — producer
 Brooke Ligertwood — co-producer
 Joel Houston — co-producer
 Ben Tan — assistant producer
 Benjamin Tennikoff — assistant producer
 Dylan Thomas — assistant producer

Executive

 Brian Houston — global senior pastor, executive producer
 Bobbie Houston — global senior pastor
 Cassandra Langton — global creative pastor
 Richard Langton — global creative pastor

International releases 

There are several international releases (translation) version of the album releases in 2017:
 El Eco De Su Voz (Spanish version) (also included songs from Hillsong Worship's Open Heaven / River Wild, Hillsong Young & Free's Youth Revival and Hillsong Worship's single "Grace to Grace")
 Que la lumière soit (French version)
 Est Werde Licht (German version)
 Toen Werd Het Licht (Dutch version)
 Да будет свет (Russian version)
 ما أجمل اسمك (Arabic version of "What a Beautiful Name")

References

Hillsong Music live albums
2016 live albums